Peshawar Circular Railway (abbreviated PCR) or Greater Peshawar Mass-Transit Circular Rail Project is a proposed inter-regional commuter rail system for the Peshawar Valley or Greater Peshawar metropolitan area which aims to connect several industrial and commercial districts within Peshawar to the outlying suburbs and cities of Jamrud, Charsadda, Mardan, Nowshera, with future expansion to Swabi. PCR will primarily serve the Metropolitan Peshawar region, with operations extending to several other communities. In August 2016, the Government of Khyber Pakhtunkhwa agreed to a $1.6 billion MoU with China Communication and Construction Company. This railway is expected to resolve transportation problems in the Peshawar region and generate jobs leading to the overall economic revival of the province.

According to the memorandum, China Communication and Construction Company shall conduct a feasibility study, inclusive of concept design, cost estimation and will prepare a technical and financial proposal to the provincial government in respect of the development of the project. It would also provide technical specification to government for the soil investigation and survey. The Government of Khyber Pakhtunkhwa shall be responsible for obtaining all approvals permits, land rights or other necessary permissions to enable the company to complete the feasibility work. The government will facilitate the company to fulfill its obligations and responsibilities by providing available relevant local technical information and other necessary documents available in respect of project. The financial model for the project has to be agreed between the parties prior to commencement of the project through an agreement to be signed after fulfilling all legal and codal formalities.

Route
Peshawar Cantonment
Peshawar City
Nasarpur
Taru Jabba
Pabbi
Pir Piai
Khushhal
Nowshera Junction
Mardan Junction
Charsadda
Charsadda-Peshawar rail link yet to be constructed

See also
 Karachi Circular Railway
 Peshawar Metro
 Transport in Pakistan

References 

Transport in Peshawar
Regional rail in Pakistan
Proposed public transport in Pakistan